Bistriji ili tuplji čovek biva kad... (Brighter or Dumber a Man Gets When...) is the only full-length album by Šarlo Akrobata. Extremely well received by the critics, it has nevertheless failed to achieve much commercial success. In the years since, however, it has reached a cult status, having often been labeled "one of the most important links in the complete oeuvre of ex-Yugo rock", and has influenced many artists in the nineties and beyond, including Rambo Amadeus and Jarboli.

Album
By early 1981 Šarlo Akrobata created enough buzz that PGP RTB came calling with an offer of a full-length album. During April 1981, Šarlo recorded the material that would eventually be named Bistriji ili tuplji čovek biva kad..., which confused PGP's executives so thoroughly that they immediately sold it to Jugoton.

Up to that point Šarlo based their sound around punk and white reggae, whereas on this record they broke new ground even by their own innovative standards.

The creative tasks were divided up according to trio's individual sensibilities. Milan's role was basic melody, Koja did his best to destabilise the sound by mixing Hendrix with punk on his bass, while Vd had the unenviable task of bridging this gap. Even the lyrics bare major differences: Koja's are minimalistic, akin to angry graffiti whereas Milan's are layered and poetic. The approach worked like a charm within the context of the record: by fusing different genres and energies they made something that was inherently their own. Jurij Novoselić, Dejan Kostić and old friend Gagi Mihajlović also took part in the recording sessions.

The album got its name from a text found in Vasa Pelagić's book Narodni učitelj. Excerpts from the same book were used on track "Pazite na decu I", a song that's significant because it features Milan playing drums, Vd on guitar, Dejan Kostić on bass, Gagi Mihajlović on piano, while Koja played percussions and let out an occasional shriek.

The record came out during the summer of 1981.

Track listing
All music and lyrics written by Šarlo Akrobata.

Personnel
Milan Mladenović - guitar, vocals
Dušan Kojić - bass guitar, vocals
Ivan Vdović - drums, vocals

Legacy
In 1998, the album was polled as the 11th on the list of 100 greatest Yugoslav rock and pop albums in the book YU 100: najbolji albumi jugoslovenske rok i pop muzike (YU 100: The Best albums of Yugoslav pop and rock music).

In 2015, the album was pronounced the second on the list of 100 greatest Yugoslav album, published by Croatian edition of Rolling Stone.

References

External links
Dušan Kojić interviewed in 2006 about the album (Serbian)

1981 debut albums
Šarlo Akrobata albums
Jugoton albums